Martin is an unincorporated community in Grant County, West Virginia, United States. Its post office  is closed.

Martin has the name of an early settler.

References

Unincorporated communities in Grant County, West Virginia
Unincorporated communities in West Virginia